Commandos Strike at Dawn is a 1942 war film directed by John Farrow and written by Irwin Shaw from a short story entitled "The Commandos" by C. S. Forester that appeared in Cosmopolitan magazine in June 1942.  Filmed in Canada, it starred Paul Muni, Anna Lee, Lillian Gish in her return to the screen, Cedric Hardwicke and Robert Coote.

Plot
Erik Toresen, a widower and peaceful man, is stirred to violence after the Nazis occupy his quiet Norwegian fishing village. German abuses lead Erik to form a Resistance group. He kills the head of the Nazis occupying his village, and then escapes to Britain, and guides some British Commandos to a raid on a secret airstrip the Germans are building on the Norwegian coast.

Cast

Production
Inspired by 1941 commando raids in Norway, Columbia Pictures registered the name "Commandos Story" in 1941 feeling the title could spawn a film.

The film was shot in the Greater Victoria, Canada, area. Saanich Inlet stands in for Norwegian fjords. The airstrip is what would become the Victoria International Airport. Hall's Boat House (now Goldstream Marina) is where the wharf scenes are shot. The Canadian Army provided a large number of troops as well as military equipment while the RCAF provided aircraft shown include two Bristol Bolingbrokes and two Westland Lysanders.
The ship used in the film was HMCS Prince David (F89) a former CN Steamship which had been converted to an Armed Merchant Cruiser in 1940.

During the 1930s, Oak Bay, British Columbia was the original "Hollywood North" when fourteen films were produced in Greater Victoria between 1933 and 1938. An off-season exhibition building on the Willows Fairgrounds was converted to a film soundstage and films were produced with stars such as Lillian Gish, Paul Muni, Sir Cedric Hardwicke, Edith Fellows, Charles Starrett and Rin Tin Tin Jr.  
The Willows Park Studio films include: 
1933 The Crimson Paradise, 
1935 Secrets of Chinatown, 
1936 Fury and the Woman (aka Lucky Corrigan),
Lucky Fugitives,
Secret Patrol,
Stampede,
Tugboat Princess,
What Price Vengeance,
Manhattan Shakedown,
Murder is News,
Woman Against the World,
Death Goes North,
Convicted,
Special Inspector, 
Commandos Strike at Dawn.

Soundtrack
The film was nominated for an Academy Award for its score by the world-renowned opera composer, Louis Gruenberg and an uncredited John Leipold. This was Gruenberg's second Hollywood film score and second nomination for one; he'd moved to Beverly Hills in the late 1930s to supplement his income and hang out with fellow LA resident, Arnold Schoenberg, whose works Gruenberg had championed when these composers could still live in Europe and not Los Angeles County.

Ann Ronell fashioned a song Out to Pick the Berries from Gruenberg's score and wrote lyrics for a theme which became known as The Commandos March.

Igor Stravinsky, who had been approached to score the film, completed his score before the film had been finished and negotiations to make revisions fell through.  Stravinsky recycled the music he had prepared for the film into his Four Norwegian Moods.

Release
The film was meant to be released in 1943, but it was released early due to the failure of the Dieppe Raid.

See also
 Lillian Gish filmography
 British Commandos in Norway

References

Works cited

External links
 
 
 
 
 
 

1942 films
Films directed by John Farrow
World War II films made in wartime
Norwegian resistance movement
Films scored by Morris Stoloff
Films set in Norway
Films shot in British Columbia
Columbia Pictures films
American black-and-white films
Films with screenplays by Irwin Shaw
American war films
1942 war films
Films based on works by C. S. Forester
Films about Norwegian resistance movement